Harrisville Township is one of the seventeen townships of Medina County, Ohio, United States.  The 2000 census found 4,914 people in the township, 1,853 of whom lived in the unincorporated portions of the township.

Geography

Located in the southwest part of the county, it borders the following townships:
Chatham Township - north
Lafayette Township - northeast corner
Westfield Township - east
Canaan Township, Wayne County - southeast
Congress Township, Wayne County - south
Homer Township - west
Spencer Township - northwest corner

The village of Lodi is located in central Harrisville Township.

Name and history
It is the only Harrisville Township statewide.

Government
The township is governed by a three-member board of trustees, who are elected in November of odd-numbered years to a four-year term beginning on the following January 1. Two are elected in the year after the presidential election and one is elected in the year before it. There is also an elected township fiscal officer, who serves a four-year term beginning on April 1 of the year after the election, which is held in November of the year before the presidential election. Vacancies in the fiscal officership or on the board of trustees are filled by the remaining trustees.

References

External links
County website

Townships in Medina County, Ohio
Townships in Ohio